This is a list of the weekly Canadian RPM magazine number one Top Singles chart of 1978.based on the publication's top 100 singles lists.

See also
1978 in music

Hot 100 number-one hits of 1978 (USA)
Cashbox Top 100 number-one singles of 1978

References
Notes

§ – RPM did not publish issues for the first two weeks of November 1978.

¶ – 2nd week on #1 assumed as RPM'''s first issue the following year was published for 13 January 1979.

External links
 Read about RPM Magazine at the AV Trust
 Search RPM'' charts here at Library and Archives Canada

 
1978 record charts
1978